Kairasi Kudumbam is a 2015 IndianTamil-language soap opera that aired on Jaya TV. It was broadcast from 22 April 2015 to 24 November 2017 at 8:30 PM (IST) and ended with 686 Episodes. The show stars Shiva, Subathira, and Vithiya. The show is directed by V. Thiruselvam.

Cast
Shiva subramanian(eramana rojave) as Sivagnanam
 Subathira as Meenakshi
 Vithiya  as Banumadhi
 Mohana as Ashika (Banumathi's friend)
 Bhagyalakshmi as Anandhi
 Srilekha Rajendran as Indirani,Meenakshi and Chitra's mother
 Vijay Krishnaraj as Meenakshi and Chitra's father
 Suresh as Shanmugam
 J.Durai Raj as Saravanan
 Thilla as Veeramani
 Parthan Siva as Sadagopan
 Jeevitha/Priyashree as Vyjayanthi
 Kiruthika as Chitra, Meenakshi's younger sister
 Srividya Natarajan as Santhi, Sivagnanam's younger sister
 Vijayaraj as Vairavan, Santhi's husband

References

External links
official website
Jaya TV on Youtube

Jaya TV television series
2015 Tamil-language television series debuts
2010s Tamil-language television series
2017 Tamil-language television series debuts
Tamil-language television shows
2017 Tamil-language television series endings